Celebrity Jeopardy! is an American game show hosted by Mayim Bialik. It is a 13-episode series consisting of a tournament played by 27 celebrities. Their winnings in the tournament are donated to a charity of their choice—runners-up in the quarterfinals receive $30,000 each for their charity, and runners-up in the semifinals receive $50,000.

Unlike previous iterations of "Celebrity Jeopardy!", which were special editions of Jeopardy!, Celebrity Jeopardy! is a separate entity, airing in a different time slot while regular episodes of Jeopardy! continue to air as normal.

Format
The series consists of a bracket tournament with 3 rounds. 27 contestants compete in 9 quarterfinal games, the winners of which advance to 3 semifinal games. The winners of each semifinal game advance to the finals, whose winner receives a $1,000,000 grand prize for their chosen charity, and the title of "Celebrity Jeopardy! Champion".

Gameplay
The structure of each episode is similar to the civilian Jeopardy! show, with clues based on 1984–2001 clue values. The "Jeopardy!" round is played with clues ranging from $100 to $500, with one Daily Double hidden among them, allowing whoever selects it to wager some or all of their score on the clue. It is followed by the "Double Jeopardy!" round, where clue values are doubled and there are two hidden Daily Double clues.

Celebrity Jeopardy! games include a third "Triple Jeopardy!" round, similar to international one-hour versions of the game. Clue values are tripled, resulting in $300–$1500, with three Daily Doubles. Typically, one category in the third round (usually the sixth) is played with a civilian champion presenting clues. Buzzy Cohen (episode 1), Austin Rogers (episode 2), current civilian host Ken Jennings (episode 3), Ryan Long (episode 5), Brad Rutter (episode 6), Matt Amodio (episode 8), Colby Burnett (episode 9), Mattea Roach (episode 10), Amy Schneider (episode 12), and James Holzhauer (episode 13) have presented categories.

At the end of the three rounds, "Final Jeopardy!" is played, where the contestants will first receive the category, then wager any amount from $0 to their current score. They then receive the clue and must write their response before the "Think!" music ends. Players' wagers are added to their score if they were correct, and subtracted if they were incorrect. The player with the highest score at the end of "Final Jeopardy!" wins the game.

Contestants
A total of 27 contestants competed in the series. Known contestants are listed here in the order of their initial episode and with the charities they are playing for.

Episodes

Ratings
The premiere episode of Celebrity Jeopardy! averaged 4.03 million viewers, placing 33rd for the week, 22nd among non-sports programs and second among ABC's non-sports programs.

References

External links
 
 

2020s American game shows
2022 American television series debuts
2023 American television series endings
American Broadcasting Company original programming
American television spin-offs
Culver City, California
English-language television shows
Jeopardy!
Television series by Sony Pictures Television
Television series created by Merv Griffin